Jafry bin Ariffin (born 26 October 1963) is a Malaysian politician who has served as the Member of Sabah State Legislative Assembly (MLA) for Sukau since September 2020. He served as the State Minister of Tourism, Culture and Environment of Sabah in the Gabungan Rakyat Sabah (GRS) state administration under Chief Minister Hajiji Noor from October 2020 to his removal from the position in January 2023. He is a member of the United Malays National Organisation (UMNO), a component party of the Barisan Nasional (BN) coalition.

Election results

Honours

Honours of Malaysia 
  :
  Medal of the Order of the Defender of the Realm (PPN) (2008)
  :
  Commander of the Order of Kinabalu (PGDK) – Datuk  (2016)

References

Members of the Sabah State Legislative Assembly
United Malays National Organisation politicians
Living people
1963 births
Commanders of the Order of Kinabalu